Geissolosimine is an antiplasmodial indole alkaloid isolated from the bark of Geissospermum vellosii.

External links

Indole alkaloids